Michael Robert Venafro (born August 2, 1973) is an American former Major League Baseball left-handed relief pitcher. He played professionally for the Texas Rangers, Oakland Athletics, Tampa Bay Devil Rays, Los Angeles Dodgers and the Colorado Rockies. He is currently a scout for the San Diego Padres.

Biography
Venafro was born in Takoma Park, Maryland and graduated from Paul VI High School in northern Virginia. He is an alumnus of James Madison University in Harrisonburg, Virginia.

Drafted by the Texas Rangers in the 29th round of the 1995 Major League Baseball Draft, Venafro made his Major League Baseball debut with the Rangers on April 24, .

Venafro is often referenced in the best selling book titled Moneyball by Michael Lewis, which details the financial aspects of the Oakland Athletics during the time Venafro played for them. He is also referred to in the 2011 film of the same name during a scene where Billy Beane (Brad Pitt) offers him to the San Francisco Giants to drive down interest in Ricardo Rincón, who Beane is attempting to acquire from Cleveland at the trading deadline.

Venafro played with three teams in postseason major league baseball including: the Los Angeles Dodgers, Oakland Athletics, and the Texas Rangers. In total, Venafro has played with 14 different baseball organizations. Venafro has 13 years of professional baseball experience; 7 of which are in the major leagues.  His major league career ERA is 4.09. He held big league lefthanded batters to a .240/.318/.310 line in parts of seven seasons.

References

External links
 

Mike Venafro at Baseball Almanac

1973 births
Living people
Baseball players from Maryland
Charleston RiverDogs players
Charlotte Rangers players
Colorado Rockies players
Colorado Springs Sky Sox players
Hudson Valley Renegades players
James Madison Dukes baseball players
James Madison University alumni
Las Vegas 51s players
Los Angeles Dodgers players
Louisville Bats players
Major League Baseball pitchers
Memphis Redbirds players
New Orleans Zephyrs players
Oklahoma RedHawks players
Omaha Royals players
Texas Rangers players
Oakland Athletics players
People from Takoma Park, Maryland
Rochester Red Wings players
Sacramento River Cats players
San Diego Padres scouts
Syracuse Chiefs players
Tampa Bay Devil Rays players
Tulsa Drillers players